Bramwell Clifford Gay (19 September 1930 – 13 December 2019) was a British trumpet and cornet player and brass band enthusiast.

Gay was born in Treorchy, Glamorgan, Wales. He joined Foden's Band at the age of 13. Gay was published extensively by Novello Music Publishing Ltd. He died at his home in France on 13 December 2019, at the age of 89.

Gay played as third trumpet for four years for Royal Opera House in Covent Garden, where he was offered the position of orchestra director (1974 to 1995). Among the people he worked with were Colin Davis, Georg Solti, and Bernard Haitink.

He played at King George VI's funeral and in Elizabeth II's coronation. He also arranged the music for Charles and Diana's wedding.

References

External links
Article on Bram Gay in 4BarsRest, the online brass band magazine
Bram Gay nominated as one of the 10 Most Influential People in the Brass Band Movement in 4BarsRest
The Parc & Dare Band - picture of Bram Gay conducting

1930 births
2019 deaths
British music arrangers
British classical trumpeters
Male trumpeters
Cornetists
British male conductors (music)
21st-century trumpeters
21st-century British conductors (music)
21st-century British male musicians
People from Rhondda Cynon Taf